The Majestic Centre, designed by Jack Manning of Manning Mitchell in association with Kendon McGrail of Jasmax Architects, was completed in 1991. The main building of the Majestic Centre is the Majestic Tower which is the tallest building in Wellington, New Zealand. It was, at the time of its completion, one of the three tallest buildings in the country, the two other contenders (ANZ Centre and ASB Tower in Auckland) being built in the same year. It is to this day the furthest south 100M+ skyscraper in the world. It is mainly used as office space.

The site was originally occupied by the Majestic theatre, also used as a cinema and cabaret which operated from 1929 to 1984. The cabaret was a key venue for ballroom events in Wellington. By the time of its closure in 1984, the cabaret was deemed to be an earthquake risk, and demolition began in 1987 to make way for its namesake high-rise building.  Dr Henry Pollen's House (aka House of Ladies) had to be saved as a condition of using the site. This building was moved from its original site at 12 Boulcott St down to the corner of Boulcott and Willis Streets. The Willis Street frontage of the Majestic Centre also incorporates the three-storey Edwardian Classical brick façade of Preston's Building, which was constructed in the early 1900s.

The curved shape of the Majestic Centre's tower was determined by wind parameters set by Wellington City Council, aimed at reducing wind gusts at street level and around buildings.  The Willis Street entrance to the building consists of a three-storey high foyer with a glass roof, reputedly the biggest in the southern hemisphere at the time of construction. The exterior of the tower is clad in bands of blue glass and alucobond on the curved area, with precast reconstituted granite concrete panels and a red granite used on other parts of the tower.  A crystallized glass called Neo-Paries, a granite alternative, was used inside the foyer.  At the top of the tower is a crown of lights on poles. 

As of 2014, Ernst & Young New Zealand is the anchor tenant, with naming rights to the building. Other tenants include Opus International Consultants Limited, the Japanese Embassy, Cigna Life Insurance New Zealand Ltd, the Earthquake Commission and Airways Corporation.

Following the 2011 Canterbury earthquake, the Majestic Tower was assessed by engineering consultants to be of moderate earthquake risk, with strengthening costs initially estimated at NZD$35 million, later revised upwards to $83-$85 million. The work was completed to 100% earthquake compliance in 2016.

See also
List of tallest structures in New Zealand
List of tallest buildings in Wellington

References

External links
The Majestic Centre

Buildings and structures in Wellington City
Skyscrapers in Wellington
1990s architecture in New Zealand
Skyscraper office buildings in New Zealand
Buildings and structures completed in 1991
Wellington Central, Wellington